Century High School is a four-year public secondary school in Pocatello, Idaho, United States. Opened in 1999, it serves the southeast portion of the Pocatello/Chubbuck School District #25, and is the newest of the district's three traditional high schools.

Residents of the Idaho State University properties which house university students with dependent children, McIntosh Manor (Building #57), Pulling Courts (Building #53), and Ridge Crest Townhomes (Building #54), are zoned to Century High School.

Athletics
Century competes in athletics in IHSAA Class 4A, the second-highest classification in the state. It is currently a member of the Great Basin (East) Conference, with Pocatello and Preston. The volleyball team won a third consecutive 4A state title in the fall of 2012. The football team won three state 4A titles in four seasons from 2000–03, as did the girls soccer team (2003–06).

State titles
Boys
 Football (3): fall (A-1 Div II, now 4A) 2000, (4A) 2001, 2003 
 Soccer (1): fall (4A) 2015

 Basketball (2): (4A) 2002, 2004 

Girls

 Soccer (3): fall (4A) 2003, 2005, 2006 
 Volleyball (5): fall (4A) 2010, 2011, 2012  2014, 2015
 Track (1): (4A) 2003  
 Tennis (3): (4A) 2012-2014 -Tennis champions-2013-2014
Combined- Tennis champions - through 2012 (combined team until 2008)
 Tennis (5): 1966, 1969, 2003, 2004, 2005  (introduced in 1963, combined until 2008)

Students Activities
Century competes in athletics in IHSAA Class 4A, the second-highest classification in the state.

State titles
Drama
 (4A) 2014, 2021
Speech
 Lincoln-Douglas Debate(5): 2005, 2006, 2007, 2008, and 2014
 Public Forum (1): 2009

References

External links

Pocatello/Chubbuck School District #25

Public high schools in Idaho
Pocatello, Idaho
Schools in Bannock County, Idaho
1999 establishments in Idaho
Educational institutions established in 1999